Acetanilide is an odourless solid chemical of leaf or flake-like appearance.  It is also known as N-phenylacetamide, acetanil, or acetanilid, and was formerly known by the trade name Antifebrin.

Preparation and properties
Acetanilide can be produced by reacting acetic anhydride with aniline: 
C6H5NH2 + (CH3CO)2O → C6H5NHCOCH3 + CH3COOH

The preparation used to be a traditional experiment in introductory organic chemistry lab classes, but it has now been widely replaced by the preparation of either paracetamol or aspirin, both of which teach the same practical techniques (especially recrystallization of the product) but which avoid the use of aniline, a suspected carcinogen.

Acetanilide is slightly soluble in  water, and stable under most conditions. Pure crystals are plate shaped and appear colorless, white, or in between.

Applications
Acetanilide is used as an inhibitor of hydrogen peroxide decomposition and is used to stabilize cellulose ester varnishes. It has also found uses in the intermediation in rubber accelerator synthesis, dyes and dye intermediate synthesis, and camphor synthesis. Acetanilide is used for the production of 4-acetamidobenzenesulfonyl chloride, a key intermediate for the manufacture of the sulfa drugs.

In the 19th century acetanilide was one of a large number of compounds used as experimental photographic developers.

Pharmaceutical use
Acetanilide was the first aniline derivative found to possess analgesic as well as antipyretic properties, and was quickly introduced into medical practice under the names of Antifebrin by A. Cahn and P. Hepp in 1886. But its (apparent) unacceptable toxic effects, the most alarming being cyanosis due to methemoglobinemia and ultimately liver and kidney damage, prompted the search for supposedly less toxic aniline derivatives such as phenacetin. After several conflicting results over the ensuing fifty years, it was established in 1948 that acetanilide was mostly metabolized to paracetamol (acetaminophen) in the human body, and that it was this metabolite that was responsible for the analgesic and antipyretic properties.  The observed methemoglobinemia after acetanilide administration was ascribed to the small proportion of acetanilide that is hydrolyzed to aniline in the body. Acetanilide is no longer used as a drug, although the efficacy of its metabolite paracetamol (acetaminophen) is well known.

See also
Nitroacetanilide

Notes

References

External links

 
Photographic chemicals
Withdrawn drugs